Davide Roda (born 21 January 1972 in Como) is an Italian auto racing driver. His first serious drive came in 2002 when he drove the Italian Alfa 147 Cup. From 2003, he spent the next three years competing in the European Alfa 147 Challenge. In 2006 he drove in the FIA World Touring Car Championship with an independent SEAT Leon. The Seat Sport Italia only managed to fund him and team mate Roberto Colciago for the first four rounds. He returned to the WTCC in 2007 for just two rounds at Brno with Proteam Motorsport in a BMW 320si. In 2008 he drove in the Spanish SEAT Leon Supercopa and the new SEAT León Eurocup.

References

External links
 

1972 births
Living people
Italian racing drivers
World Touring Car Championship drivers
SEAT León Eurocup drivers
Porsche Supercup drivers
European Touring Car Cup drivers
TCR International Series drivers

Zengő Motorsport drivers